The Des Moines River Bridge in Humboldt, Iowa was a plate girder bridge built in 1939 located in Humboldt County, Iowa. It was listed on the National Register of Historic Places (NRHP) in 1998. The bridge was rated functionally obsolete in 2008 and was replaced in 2010. It was removed from the NRHP in 2019.

References

Transportation buildings and structures in Humboldt County, Iowa
Road bridges on the National Register of Historic Places in Iowa
Humboldt, Iowa
Bridges completed in 1939
National Register of Historic Places in Humboldt County, Iowa
Plate girder bridges in the United States
Former National Register of Historic Places in Iowa